The 2013–14 UEFA Youth League was the first season of the UEFA Youth League, a European youth club football competition organised by UEFA. It was contested by the under-19 youth teams of the 32 clubs qualified for the group stage of the 2013–14 UEFA Champions League.

The final was played on 14 April 2014 at the Colovray Stadium in Nyon, Switzerland, between Benfica and Barcelona. Barcelona won 3–0 and became the first team to lift the Lennart Johansson Trophy, named after UEFA's honorary president.

Players had to be born on or after 1 January 1995.

Round and draw dates
The schedule of the competition was as follows.

Group stage

The 32 teams were drawn into eight groups of four, with the group compositions determined by the draw for the 2013–14 UEFA Champions League group stage, which was held in Monaco on 29 August 2013. In each group, teams played against each other home-and-away in a round-robin format. The matchdays were 17–18 September, 1–2 October, 22–23 October, 5–6 November, 26–27 November, and 10–11 December 2013, with the matches played on the same matchday as the corresponding Champions League matches (though not necessarily on the same day, and some matches were played on Mondays and Thursdays). The group winners and runners-up advanced to the round of 16.

Tiebreakers
The teams are ranked according to points (3 points for a win, 1 point for a tie, 0 points for a loss). If two or more teams are equal on points on completion of the group matches, the following criteria are applied to determine the rankings:
higher number of points obtained in the group matches played among the teams in question;
superior goal difference from the group matches played among the teams in question;
higher number of goals scored in the group matches played among the teams in question;
higher number of goals scored away from home in the group matches played among the teams in question;
If, after applying criteria 1 to 4 to several teams, two teams still have an equal ranking, criteria 1 to 4 are reapplied exclusively to the matches between the two teams in question to determine their final rankings. If this procedure does not lead to a decision, criteria 6 to 9 apply;
superior goal difference from all group matches played;
higher number of goals scored from all group matches played;
lower disciplinary points total based only on yellow and red cards received during the group stage (red card = 3 points, yellow card = 1 point, expulsion for two yellow cards in one match = 3 points);
drawing of lots.

Times up to 26 October 2013 (matchdays 1–3) were CEST (UTC+2), thereafter (matchdays 4–6) times were CET (UTC+1).

Group A

Group B

Group C

Group D

Group E

Group F

Group G

Group H

The match was cancelled due to the refusal of Ajax players to take the field, as they considered the condition of the pitch not sufficient to ensure the safety of the players. The match was irrelevant for the qualification to the knockout phase.

Knockout phase
In the knockout phase, teams played against each other over one match. If scores were level after full-time, the match was decided by penalty shoot-out (no extra time). The mechanism of the draws for each round was as follows:
In the draw for the round of 16, the eight group winners were seeded, and the eight group runners-up were unseeded. The seeded teams were drawn against the unseeded teams, with the seeded teams hosting the match. Teams from the same group or the same association could not be drawn against each other.
In the draws for the quarter-finals onwards, there were no seedings, and teams from the same group or the same association could be drawn against each other. The draw also decided the home team for each quarter-final, and the "home" team for administrative purposes for each semi-final and final (which were played on neutral ground).

Times up to 29 March 2014 (round of 16 and quarter-finals) were CET (UTC+1), thereafter (semi-finals and final) times were CEST (UTC+2).

Bracket
The draw for the knockout phase was held on 16 December 2013.

Round of 16
The round of 16 matches were played on 18, 25 and 26 February 2014.

Quarter-finals
The quarter-final matches were played on 11, 16 and 18 March 2014.

Semi-finals
The semi-finals were played on 11 April 2014 at the Colovray Stadium in Nyon, Switzerland.

Final
The final was played on 14 April 2014 at the Colovray Stadium in Nyon, Switzerland.

Statistics

Top goalscorers

Top assists

References

External links
2013–14 UEFA Youth League
Final tournament: Nyon 2014

Youth
2013-14
Uefa Youth League
Uefa Youth League